Elizabeth Wilmot, Countess of Rochester (née Malet; 1651 – 20 August 1681) was an English heiress and the wife of John Wilmot, 2nd Earl of Rochester, the "libertine". She was the daughter of John Malet, of Enmore Manor, and Unton Hawley, daughter of Francis Hawley, 1st Baron Hawley.

Rochester
John Wilmot, 2nd Earl of Rochester became infatuated with Elizabeth Malet and asked for her hand in marriage. She refused to marry the earl, and on 26 May 1665 he attempted to abduct her. In his diaries, Samuel Pepys describes Elizabeth Malet as the "great beauty and fortune of the North" and notes the scandal of her kidnapping by Rochester:
Thence to my Lady Sandwich’s, where, to my shame, I had not been a great while before. Here, upon my telling her a story of my Lord Rochester’s running away on Friday night last with Mrs. Mallett, the great beauty and fortune of the North, who had supped at White Hall with Mrs. Stewart, and was going home to her lodgings with her grandfather, my Lord Haly, by coach; and was at Charing Cross seized on by both horse and foot men, and forcibly taken from him, and put into a coach with six horses, and two women provided to receive her, and carried away. Upon immediate pursuit, my Lord of Rochester (for whom the King had spoke to the lady often, but with no successe) was taken at Uxbridge; but the lady is not yet heard of, and the King mighty angry, and the Lord sent to the Tower. Hereupon my Lady did confess to me, as a great secret, her being concerned in this story. For if this match breaks between my Lord Rochester and her, then, by the consent of all her friends, my Lord Hinchingbroke stands fair, and is invited for her. She is worth, and will be at her mother’s death (who keeps but a little from her), 2500l. per annum.

Graham Greene corrects Pepys. He writes about the Heiress of the West.

Elizabeth Malet later forgave Rochester, and they were married on 29 January 1667.

After the couple married, Rochester spent much of his time in London, where he engaged in public affairs, most famously with the actress Elizabeth Barry. Elizabeth Wilmot stayed in his house, Adderbury House in Oxfordshire, along with Rochester's mother Anne Wilmot, Countess of Rochester, her mother Elizabeth Hawley, and Rochester's nieces Eleanor and Anne Lee (later the poet Anne Wharton).

Children
 Charles Wilmot, 3rd Earl of Rochester (christened 2 January 1670/71 – 12 November 1681)
 Lady Anne Wilmot (christened 30 August 1669 – 8 August 1703) married firstly Henry Bayntun, Esq., a country gentleman, by whom she had issue one son and one daughter Anne Bayntun (mother of Sir Edward Bayntun-Rolt, 1st Baronet). She married secondly the poet Hon. Francis Greville, MP (1 July 1667 – 11 October 1710), eldest son of Fulke Greville, 5th Baron Brooke of Beauchamps Court, and had two sons, the 6th and 7th Barons Brooke; the 7th Baron was father of Francis Greville, 1st Earl of Warwick.
 Lady Elizabeth Wilmot (christened 13 July 1674 – 1 July 1757); she married 8 July 1689 Edward Montagu, 3rd Earl of Sandwich (10 April 1670 – 20 October 1729), and had issue, one daughter (who died young) and one son Edward Montagu, Viscount Hinchingbrooke, father of John Montagu, 4th Earl of Sandwich (for whom the sandwich is named). She became renowned for her learning and wit.
 Lady Malet Wilmot (christened 6 January 1676 – 13 January 1708/9) married John Vaughan, 1st Viscount Lisburne on 18 August 1692; their son was Wilmot Vaughan, 3rd Viscount Lisburne, father of Wilmot Vaughan, 1st Earl of Lisburne, ancestor of the present Earl.

Death
Elizabeth Wilmot died in 1681, a little more than a year after her husband, aged 29 or 30. Her son Charles died soon thereafter.

Poetry
Elizabeth Wilmot's poetry survives in a manuscript that she and her husband produced together. The manuscript, now held by the University of Nottingham, includes songs and a fragment of a pastoral attributed to Elizabeth Wilmot, some of which has been anthologized in Kissing the Rod: An Anthology of Seventeenth-Century Women's Verse.

In popular culture
In the 2004 movie The Libertine, Elizabeth was portrayed by Rosamund Pike.

Notes 
Footnotes

Citations

References 
 Johnson, James William. A Profane Wit: The Life of John Wilmot, Earl of Rochester. Rochester, NY, U.S.: University of Rochester Press, 2004.
 Kissing the Rod: An Anthology of Seventeenth-Century Women's Verse. Edited by Germaine Greer, Susan Hastings, Jeslyn Medoff, and Melinda Sansone. New York: The Noonday Press, 1988.

External links
A description of letters from John Wilmot, Earl of Rochester's mother (some of which concern Eilzabeth Malet Wilmot)
Elizabeth Malet Wilmot's abduction
Elizabeth Malet Wilmot's abduction detailed
Samuel Pepys' description of Elizabeth Malet Wilmot's abduction
The Perdita Project link to Elizabeth Malet Wilmot's manuscript poetry

See also
List of kidnappings
List of solved missing person cases

1651 births
1681 deaths
17th-century English poets
17th-century English women
Formerly missing people
English countesses
English women poets
Kidnapped English people
People from Sedgemoor (district)